Nathan "Bassy" Bassett (born 7 December 1976) is a former Australian rules footballer for the Adelaide Football Club in the Australian Football League (AFL). He is currently an assistant coach with the Port Adelaide Football Club.

Career
Bassett made his SANFL debut for Norwood in 1994, he finished sixth in the club best and fairest as a 19-year-old and was drafted at pick 3 by Melbourne Football Club in the inaugural AFL rookie draft.

Melbourne 
When he made his return to the reserves he played six more games at full forward but didn't see much of the ball and wasn't suited to the role. At the end of the season he was traded to Adelaide for Matthew Collins and Brent Williams.

Adelaide 
Bassett impressed in the pre season and made his debut at 21 for the Crows in round 1 1998, showing promise in defence. He was hardly beaten in his debut season, finishing tenth in the Best and Fairest despite only playing 13 games and missing out on finals.

He played 210 games for Adelaide and topped off a great 2005 season by being named Best Team Man and coming runner up in the club's Best and Fairest award.

In 2006 Bassett was named to the All-Australian Team, along with his teammates Andrew McLeod and Simon Goodwin.

Some of Bassett's nicknames include The Hound, Bassy, Bruce and Fred Basset – after the comic strip which appears in many Australian newspapers.

He was diagnosed with type 1 diabetes in 1997.

Statistics

|- style="background-color: #EAEAEA"
! scope="row" style="text-align:center" | 1998
|style="text-align:center;"|
| 8 || 13 || 1 || 0 || 90 || 33 || 123 || 34 || 19 || 0.1 || 0.0 || 6.9 || 2.5 || 9.5 || 2.6 || 1.5
|-
! scope="row" style="text-align:center" | 1999
|style="text-align:center;"|
| 8 || 21 || 1 || 0 || 154 || 60 || 214 || 69 || 10 || 0.0 || 0.0 || 7.3 || 2.9 || 10.2 || 3.3 || 0.5
|- style="background-color: #EAEAEA"
! scope="row" style="text-align:center" | 2000
|style="text-align:center;"|
| 8 || 18 || 4 || 4 || 159 || 62 || 221 || 79 || 26 || 0.2 || 0.2 || 8.8 || 3.4 || 12.3 || 4.4 || 1.4
|-
! scope="row" style="text-align:center" | 2001
|style="text-align:center;"|
| 8 || 13 || 0 || 0 || 93 || 58 || 151 || 44 || 7 || 0.0 || 0.0 || 7.2 || 4.5 || 11.6 || 3.4 || 0.5
|- style="background-color: #EAEAEA"
! scope="row" style="text-align:center" | 2002
|style="text-align:center;"|
| 8 || 20 || 9 || 3 || 136 || 73 || 209 || 52 || 30 || 0.5 || 0.2 || 6.8 || 3.7 || 10.5 || 2.6 || 1.5
|-
! scope="row" style="text-align:center" | 2003
|style="text-align:center;"|
| 8 || 21 || 3 || 1 || 135 || 117 || 252 || 80 || 25 || 0.1 || 0.0 || 6.4 || 5.6 || 12.0 || 3.8 || 1.2
|- style="background-color: #EAEAEA"
! scope="row" style="text-align:center" | 2004
|style="text-align:center;"|
| 8 || 21 || 1 || 0 || 133 || 96 || 229 || 82 || 27 || 0.0 || 0.0 || 6.3 || 4.6 || 10.9 || 3.9 || 1.3
|-
! scope="row" style="text-align:center" | 2005
|style="text-align:center;"|
| 8 || 25 || 2 || 2 || 200 || 176 || 376 || 120 || 45 || 0.1 || 0.1 || 8.0 || 7.0 || 15.0 || 4.8 || 1.8
|- style="background-color: #EAEAEA"
! scope="row" style="text-align:center" | 2006
|style="text-align:center;"|
| 8 || 22 || 2 || 0 || 248 || 149 || 397 || 172 || 41 || 0.1 || 0.0 || 11.3 || 6.8 || 18.0 || 7.8 || 1.9
|-
! scope="row" style="text-align:center" | 2007
|style="text-align:center;"|
| 8 || 13 || 1 || 0 || 132 || 69 || 201 || 93 || 26 || 0.1 || 0.0 || 10.2 || 5.3 || 15.5 || 7.2 || 2.0
|- style="background-color: #EAEAEA"
! scope="row" style="text-align:center" | 2008
|style="text-align:center;"|
| 8 || 23 || 1 || 0 || 188 || 179 || 367 || 127 || 39 || 0.0 || 0.0 || 8.2 || 7.8 || 16.0 || 5.5 || 1.7
|- class="sortbottom"
! colspan=3| Career
! 210
! 25
! 10
! 1668
! 1072
! 2740
! 952
! 295
! 0.1
! 0.0
! 7.9
! 5.1
! 13.0
! 4.5
! 1.4
|}

Coaching
Bassett was the senior coach of the Norwood Football Club which plays in the South Australian National Football League (SANFL). He coached them to the Grand Final in his first season in 2010, where they were runners up. He then led the Redlegs to their 28th SANFL premiership with a 12.7 (79) to 3.12 (30) win over West Adelaide in the 2012 Grand Final at AAMI Stadium. Back-to-back premiership success came in 2013 over North Adelaide. At the last match ever played at AAMI Stadium, in front of almost 37,000 fans, Norwood defeated North Adelaide 10.12 (72) to 4.8 (32).

On 17 October 2013, Bassett was confirmed as an assistant coach to Mark Thompson at Essendon. The move reunited Bassett with former Adelaide coach Neil Craig, who Bassett played under from 2004 to 2008. He remained an assistant at Essendon until the end of 2015.

On 18 September 2015, Bassett was announced as an assistant coach at the Port Adelaide Football Club.

References

External links

 

1976 births
Living people
Australian rules footballers from Adelaide
Adelaide Football Club players
Norwood Football Club coaches
All-Australians (AFL)